Dan Vadis (born Constantine Daniel Vafiadis, 3 January 1938 – 11 June 1987) was an American actor famous for his lead roles in many Italian films made in the 1960s.

Biography
Vadis was of Greek descent, with lineage tracing back to the island of Chios in the Aegean Sea. This former U.S. Navy sailor and bodybuilder was a member of the Mae West "Muscleman Revue" in the late 1950s. He was a brawny, handsome durable 6'4" man with curly brown hair, bluish green eyes and an affable demeanor. He was probably one of the most memorable actors in the Roman epic movies created in the 1960s and early '70s to portray Hercules - the most famous Greek warrior.

He was also one of many bodybuilders to take a stab at fame and fortune with the Italian peplum films of the 1960s. Noted film critic Raymond Durgnat famously asked if he was "the brother of Quo?".<ref>p.71 Frayling, Christopher Spaghetti Westerns: Cowboys and Europeans from Karl May to Sergio Leone" 1981 Routledge</ref>

Dan's most notable role was The Triumph of Hercules (1964), in which he portrayed Hercules battling golden giants and trying to save his princess love from her evil relative. The film was quickly followed by Hercules the Invincible retitled Son of Hercules in the Land of Darkness, in The Sons of Hercules television package by Embassy Pictures. What made Vadis stand out from other athletes and bodybuilders in these films was the obvious speed, dexterity, agility and all around durability that he brought to his films, bringing much needed energy to what otherwise may have been average fight scenes. 

After the sword and sandal films faded he moved into Spaghetti Westerns, then became a recurring face in Clint Eastwood movies such as High Plains Drifter, The Gauntlet, Every Which Way But Loose, Any Which Way You Can and  Bronco Billy.

He died 11 June 1987 in Lancaster, California, United States, in a car in the desert, his death was declared an accidental drug overdose with acute ethanol and heroin-morphine intoxication. He was survived by his wife Sharon Jessup and his son Nick Vadis, known as "Nick V".

Partial filmographyColossus of the Arena (1962) - SidonThe Rebel Gladiators (1962) - UrsusThe Pirates of the Mississippi (1963) - BlackfootThe Ten Gladiators (1963) - Roccia / The RockHercules the Invincible (1964) - HerculesZorikan lo sterminatore (1964) - ZorikanThe Triumph of Hercules (1964) - ErcoleTriumph of the Ten Gladiators (1964) - Roccia Spartacus and the Ten Gladiators (1964) - Gladiator RocciaThe Sucker (1965) - (uncredited)Deguejo (1966) - RamonKommissar X – Drei gelbe Katzen (1966) - KingFor a Few Extra Dollars (1966) - Nelson RiggsThe Stranger Returns (1967) - En PleinThe Scalphunters (1968) - YumaDio perdoni la mia pistola (1969) - MartinHigh Plains Drifter (1973) - Dan Carlin, outlawCahill U.S. Marshal (1973) - BrownieThe White Buffalo (1977) - Tall Man (uncredited)The Gauntlet (1977) - BikerEvery Which Way But Loose (1978) - Frank (Black Widow)Bronco Billy (1980) - Chief Big EagleAny Which Way You Can (1980) - Frank (Black Widow)I sette magnifici gladiatori'' (1982) - Nicerote (final film role)

Notes

External links
 

1938 births
1987 deaths
American male film actors
American bodybuilders
American expatriates in Italy
Male Spaghetti Western actors
20th-century American male actors
Accidental deaths in California
American expatriates in China
American people of Greek descent
Drug-related deaths in California
People associated with physical culture